Jérôme Gilbert (born 22 January 1984) is a Belgian former racing cyclist, who competed professionally between 2012 and 2015. He is the younger brother of Philippe Gilbert.

References

1984 births
Living people
Belgian male cyclists
People from Verviers
Cyclists from Liège Province